Brad Feldman (born 1967) is an American television/radio announcer, radio personality, and broadcasting executive. He is the radio play-by-play announcer for the New England Revolution of Major League Soccer.

Early life
Feldman was born in Hanover, New Hampshire on April 6, 1967. He is the son of artist Diane Feldman and Joel J. Feldman, a plastic surgeon who worked with burn victims and was Clinical Professor of Plastic Surgery at Harvard University. Brad Feldman attended Shady Hill School, in Cambridge, MA and graduated from Belmont Hill School. He earned his BA from the Johns Hopkins University, a master's degree from Columbia University Graduate School of Journalism and an MBA at Northeastern University.

Broadcasting career
Feldman worked in television production in Los Angeles, then worked as a print news and sports reporter before moving into sports television production in New York City. Feldman launched his sportscasting career at TV stations in Texas, New York, and New Jersey. He first began covering professional soccer while working as a sideline reporter for Kansas City Wizards matches.

A TV and radio announcer on New England Revolution broadcasts since 2001, Feldman has been the play-by-play voice for Revolution radio and television broadcasts since 2005. He has also provided analysis and sideline reporting on Revolution telecasts from 2001-04. A broadcast team member for the club's U.S. Open Cup and SuperLiga championship-winning matches Feldman was also a radio announcer for all five Revolution MLS Cup appearances.

Feldman hosted the online programs RevsWrap and In the Net, Revolution Postgame Live and State of the Revs on NBC Sports Boston and hosted the program Inside the Revolution on MyTV New England. He currently hosts the talk show Outside the Booth with Charlie Davies on revolutionsoccer.net and other digital platforms. He provided FIFA World Cup analysis for NBC Sports Boston and NECN in 2014 and ESPN Boston in 2010. Revolution broadcasts moved to WBZ-TV, WSBK-TV, and MyRITV in 2021.

Other networks and tournaments
Feldman worked for four seasons as a play-by-play commentator on ESPN International covering several top European soccer leagues.  He also provided commentary for MLS, USL, WUSA, and college soccer games on Fox Soccer Channel and UEFA Champions League games on Setanta Sports.

Business career
Feldman works as the Executive Producer for Kraft Sports + Entertainment's Revolution telecasts, and previously held several other titles in the Kraft organization's broadcasting and communications departments. Feldman also co-founded Sala USA, the American distributor of Munich futsal shoes, with former player Ilija Stolica.

Personal life
Feldman lives in Massachusetts and is married to Elizabeth Graham. Their daughter, Miriam Ames Feldman, studies philosophy, politics, and economics at New College at the University of Oxford. Graham is the Chief Operating Officer at Indigo AG. Feldman served on advisory boards for Grassroot Soccer and the Kicking & Screening soccer film festival and participated in the March of the Living at Auschwitz in Poland with Revolution and Chelsea FC staff.

References

External links
Interview in Soccer Magazine
Interview about New England Revolution's rapid rise
Audio of Brad Feldman
Audio of Brad Feldman on WEEI
Feldman in the New York Times online on CONCACAF Champions League
Photo in Boston Globe at Grassroot Soccer fundraiser
Feldman in the Boston Globe on Fulham FC star Clint Dempsey
New England Revolution announces deal with Comcast Sports Net

Association football commentators
American radio sports announcers
American television sports announcers
Living people
1967 births
People from Hanover, New Hampshire
Major League Soccer broadcasters
Johns Hopkins University alumni
Columbia University Graduate School of Journalism alumni
Belmont Hill School alumni
Shady Hill School alumni